Ricardo Villalobos (born 6 August 1970) is a Chilean-born German electronic music producer and DJ. He is well known for his work in the minimal techno and microhouse genres, and is one of the most significant figures in today's minimal techno scene.

Life and work
Villalobos was born in Chile on 6 August 1970. In 1973 he moved to Germany with his family to escape the dictatorship of Augusto Pinochet, who had seized power that year.

When Villalobos was around 10 or 11 he started to play conga and bongos. He began making electronic music in the late 80s. From a very young age he has been a big fan of Depeche Mode, following their tours around Europe to listen to them.

Villalobos began to play his music at parties while he was studying at university, but this was only for his own enjoyment. He started a label, Placid Flavour, in 1993 but this was unsuccessful. His first record was released on the German Playhouse label in 1994 and he began DJing as a professional in 1998.

In 2006 Villalobos, along with Richie Hawtin and Luciano, played to around 300,000 people at the Berlin Loveparade.

At the end of 2007, 2008 and 2010, he came first in Resident Advisor's Top 100 DJs of the year.

Villalobos has released several records on various notable labels, such as Perlon, Playhouse and [a:rpia:r].

Discography

Studio albums
Alcachofa (2003)
Thé Au Harem D'Archimède (2004)
Sei Es Drum (2007)
Dependent and Happy (2012)
Empirical House (2017)

Compilations
Love Family Trax (2002)
In the Mix: Taka Taka (2003)
Green & Blue (2005)
fabric36 (2007)

Singles and EPs

Remixes

References

External links

Biography at The DJ List
Biography at GTB

Ricardo Villalobos: Sound brotherhood Interview (2009) at Resident Advisor
Interview (2004)
At home in Berlin with Ricardo Villalobos

1970 births
Living people
Chilean emigrants to Germany
German techno musicians
German DJs
People from Santiago
Electronic dance music DJs